Brian Blutreich (born January 5, 1967) is an American athlete. He competed in the men's discus throw at the 1992 Summer Olympics.

References

1967 births
Living people
Athletes (track and field) at the 1992 Summer Olympics
American male discus throwers
Olympic track and field athletes of the United States
Place of birth missing (living people)